Gastroesophageal reflux disease (GERD) or gastro-oesophageal reflux disease (GORD)  is one of the upper gastrointestinal chronic diseases in which stomach content persistently and regularly flows up into the esophagus, resulting in symptoms and/or complications. Symptoms include dental corrosion, dysphagia, heartburn, odynophagia, regurgitation, non-cardiac chest pain, extraesophageal symptoms such as chronic cough, hoarseness, reflux-induced laryngitis, or asthma. In the long term, and when not treated, complications such as esophagitis, esophageal stricture, and Barrett's esophagus may arise.

Risk factors include obesity, pregnancy, smoking, hiatal hernia, and taking certain medications. Medications that may cause or worsen the disease include benzodiazepines, calcium channel blockers, tricyclic antidepressants, NSAIDs, and certain asthma medicines. Acid reflux is due to poor closure of the lower esophageal sphincter, which is at the junction between the stomach and the esophagus. Diagnosis among those who do not improve with simpler measures may involve gastroscopy, upper GI series, esophageal pH monitoring, or esophageal manometry.

Treatment options include lifestyle changes, medications, and sometimes surgery for those who do not improve with the first two measures. Lifestyle changes include not lying down for three hours after eating, lying down on the left side, raising the pillow or bedhead height, losing weight, and stopping smoking. Foods that may precipitate GERD symptoms  include coffee, alcohol, chocolate, fatty foods, acidic foods, and spicy foods. Medications include antacids, H2 receptor blockers, proton pump inhibitors, and prokinetics.

In the Western world, between 10 and 20% of the population is affected by GERD. It is highly prevalent in North America with 18% to 28% of the population suffering from the condition. Occasional gastroesophageal reflux without troublesome symptoms or complications is even more common. The classic symptoms of GERD were first described in 1925, when Friedenwald and Feldman commented on heartburn and its possible relationship to a hiatal hernia. In 1934 gastroenterologist Asher Winkelstein described reflux and attributed the symptoms to stomach acid.

Signs and symptoms

Adults 
The most common symptoms of GERD in adults are an acidic taste in the mouth, regurgitation, and heartburn. Less common symptoms include pain with swallowing/sore throat, increased salivation (also known as water brash), nausea, chest pain, coughing, and globus sensation. The acid reflux can induce asthma attack symptoms like shortness of breath, cough, and wheezing in those with underlying asthma.

GERD sometimes causes injury to the esophagus. These injuries may include one or more of the following:
 Reflux esophagitis – inflammation of esophageal epithelium which can cause ulcers near the junction of the stomach and esophagus
 Esophageal strictures – the persistent narrowing of the esophagus caused by reflux-induced inflammation
 Barrett's esophagus – intestinal metaplasia (changes of the epithelial cells from squamous to intestinal columnar epithelium) of the distal esophagus
 Esophageal adenocarcinoma – a form of cancer

GERD sometimes causes injury of the larynx (LPR). Other complications can include aspiration pneumonia.

Children and babies 
GERD may be difficult to detect in infants and children since they cannot describe what they are feeling and indicators must be observed. Symptoms may vary from typical adult symptoms. GERD in children may cause repeated vomiting, effortless spitting up, coughing, and other respiratory problems, such as wheezing. Inconsolable crying, refusing food, crying for food and then pulling off the bottle or breast only to cry for it again, failure to gain adequate weight, bad breath, and burping are also common. Children may have one symptom or many; no single symptom is universal in all children with GERD.

Of the estimated 4 million babies born in the US each year, up to 35% of them may have difficulties with reflux in the first few months of their lives, known as 'spitting up'. About 90% of infants will outgrow their reflux by their first birthday.

Mouth 

Acid reflux into the mouth can cause breakdown of the enamel, especially on the inside surface of the teeth. A dry mouth, acid or burning sensation in the mouth, bad breath and redness of the palate may occur. Less common symptoms of GERD include difficulty in swallowing, water brash, chronic cough, hoarse voice, nausea and vomiting.

Signs of enamel erosion are the appearance of a smooth, silky-glazed, sometimes dull, enamel surface with the absence of perikymata, together with intact enamel along the gum margin. It will be evident in people with restorations as tooth structure typically dissolves much faster than the restorative material, causing it to seem as if it “stands above” the surrounding tooth structure.

Barrett's esophagus 

GERD may lead to Barrett's esophagus, a type of intestinal metaplasia, which is in turn a precursor condition for esophageal cancer. The risk of progression from Barrett's to dysplasia is uncertain, but is estimated at 20% of cases. Due to the risk of chronic heartburn progressing to Barrett's, EGD every five years is recommended for people with chronic heartburn, or who take drugs for chronic GERD.

Causes 

A small amount of acid reflux is typical even in healthy people (as with infrequent and minor heartburn), but gastroesophageal reflux becomes gastroesophageal reflux disease when signs and symptoms develop into a recurrent problem. Frequent acid reflux is due to poor closure of the lower esophageal sphincter, which is at the junction between the stomach and the esophagus.

Factors that can contribute to GERD:
 Hiatal hernia, which increases the likelihood of GERD due to mechanical and motility factors.
 Obesity: increasing body mass index is associated with more severe GERD. In a large series of 2,000 patients with symptomatic reflux disease, it has been shown that 13% of changes in esophageal acid exposure is attributable to changes in body mass index.

Factors that have been linked with GERD, but not conclusively:
 Obstructive sleep apnea
 Gallstones, which can impede the flow of bile into the duodenum, which can affect the ability to neutralize gastric acid

In 1999, a review of existing studies found that, on average, 40% of GERD patients also had H. pylori infection. The eradication of H. pylori can lead to an increase in acid secretion, leading to the question of whether H. pylori-infected GERD patients are any different than non-infected GERD patients. A double-blind study, reported in 2004, found no clinically significant difference between these two types of patients with regard to the subjective or objective measures of disease severity.

Diagnosis 

The diagnosis of GERD is usually made when typical symptoms are present. Reflux can be present in people without symptoms and the diagnosis requires both symptoms or complications and reflux of stomach content.

Other investigations may include esophagogastroduodenoscopy (EGD). Barium swallow X-rays should not be used for diagnosis. Esophageal manometry is not recommended for use in the diagnosis, being recommended only prior to surgery. Ambulatory esophageal pH monitoring may be useful in those who do not improve after PPIs and is not needed in those in whom Barrett's esophagus is seen. Investigation for H. pylori is not usually needed.

The current gold standard for diagnosis of GERD is esophageal pH monitoring. It is the most objective test to diagnose the reflux disease and allows monitoring GERD patients in their response to medical or surgical treatment. One practice for diagnosis of GERD is a short-term treatment with proton-pump inhibitors, with improvement in symptoms suggesting a positive diagnosis. Short-term treatment with proton-pump inhibitors may help predict abnormal 24-hour pH monitoring results among patients with symptoms suggestive of GERD.

Endoscopy 
Endoscopy, the examination of the stomach with a fibre-optic scope, is not routinely needed if the case is typical and responds to treatment. It is recommended when people either do not respond well to treatment or have alarm symptoms, including dysphagia, anemia, blood in the stool (detected chemically), wheezing, weight loss, or voice changes. Some physicians advocate either once-in-a-lifetime or 5- to 10-yearly endoscopy for people with longstanding GERD, to evaluate the possible presence of dysplasia or Barrett's esophagus.

Biopsies performed during gastroscopy may show:
 Edema and basal hyperplasia (nonspecific inflammatory changes)
 Lymphocytic inflammation (nonspecific)
 Neutrophilic inflammation (usually due to reflux or Helicobacter gastritis)
 Eosinophilic inflammation (usually due to reflux): The presence of intraepithelial eosinophils may suggest a diagnosis of eosinophilic esophagitis (EE) if eosinophils are present in high enough numbers. Less than 20 eosinophils per high-power microscopic field in the distal esophagus, in the presence of other histologic features of GERD, is more consistent with GERD than EE.
 Goblet cell intestinal metaplasia or Barrett's esophagus
 Elongation of the papillae
 Thinning of the squamous cell layer
 Dysplasia
 Carcinoma

Reflux changes that are not erosive in nature lead to "nonerosive reflux disease".

Severity 
Severity may be documented with the Johnson-DeMeester's scoring system:
0 – None
1 – Minimal – occasional episodes
2 – Moderate – medical therapy visits
3 – Severe – interference with daily activities

Differential diagnosis 
Other causes of chest pain such as heart disease should be ruled out before making the diagnosis. Another kind of acid reflux, which causes respiratory and laryngeal signs and symptoms, is called laryngopharyngeal reflux (LPR) or extraesophageal reflux disease (EERD). Unlike GERD, LPR rarely produces heartburn, and is sometimes called silent reflux. Differential diagnosis of GERD can also include dyspepsia, peptic ulcer disease, esophageal and gastric cancer, and food allergies.

Treatment 
The treatments for GERD may include food choices, lifestyle changes, medications, and possibly surgery. Initial treatment is frequently with a proton-pump inhibitor such as omeprazole. In some cases, a person with GERD symptoms can manage them by taking over-the-counter drugs. This is often safer and less expensive than taking prescription drugs. Some guidelines recommend trying to treat symptoms with an H2 antagonist before using a proton-pump inhibitor because of cost and safety concerns.

Medical nutrition therapy and lifestyle changes 
Medical nutrition therapy plays an essential role in managing the symptoms of the disease by preventing reflux, preventing pain and irritation, and decreasing gastric secretions.

Some foods such as chocolate, mint, high-fat food, and alcohol have been shown to relax the lower esophageal sphincter, increasing the risk of reflux. Weight loss is recommended for the overweight or obese, as well as avoidance of  bedtime snacks or lying down immediately after meals (meals should occur at least 2–3 hours before bedtime), elevation of the head of the bed on 6-inch blocks, avoidance of smoking, and avoidance of tight clothing that increases pressure in the stomach. It may be beneficial to avoid spices, citrus juices, tomatoes and soft drinks, and to consume small frequent meals and drink liquids between meals. Some evidence suggests that reduced sugar intake and increased fiber intake can help. Although moderate exercise may improve symptoms in people with GERD, vigorous exercise may worsen them. Breathing exercises may relieve GERD symptoms.

Medications 

The primary medications used for GERD are proton-pump inhibitors, H2 receptor blockers and antacids with or without alginic acid. The use of acid suppression therapy is a common response to GERD symptoms and many people get more of this kind of treatment than their case merits. The overuse of acid suppression is a problem because of the side effects and costs.

Proton-pump inhibitors 
Proton-pump inhibitors (PPIs), such as omeprazole, are the most effective, followed by H2 receptor blockers, such as ranitidine. If a once-daily PPI is only partially effective they may be used twice a day. They should be taken one half to one hour before a meal. There is no significant difference between PPIs. When these medications are used long term, the lowest effective dose should be taken. They may also be taken only when symptoms occur in those with frequent problems. H2 receptor blockers lead to roughly a 40% improvement.

Antacids 
The evidence for antacids is weaker with a benefit of about 10% (NNT=13) while a combination of an antacid and alginic acid (such as Gaviscon) may improve symptoms by 60% (NNT=4). Metoclopramide (a prokinetic) is not recommended either alone or in combination with other treatments due to concerns around adverse effects. The benefit of the prokinetic mosapride is modest.

Other agents 
Sucralfate has similar effectiveness to H2 receptor blockers; however, sucralfate needs to be taken multiple times a day, thus limiting its use. Baclofen, an agonist of the GABAB receptor, while effective, has similar issues of needing frequent dosing in addition to greater adverse effects compared to other medications.

Surgery 
The standard surgical treatment for severe GERD is the Nissen fundoplication. In this procedure, the upper part of the stomach is wrapped around the lower esophageal sphincter to strengthen the sphincter and prevent acid reflux and to repair a hiatal hernia. It is recommended only for those who do not improve with PPIs. Quality of life is improved in the short term compared to medical therapy, but there is uncertainty in the benefits of surgery versus long-term medical management with proton pump inhibitors. When comparing different fundoplication techniques, partial posterior fundoplication surgery is more effective than partial anterior fundoplication surgery, and partial fundoplication has better outcomes than total fundoplication.

Esophagogastric dissociation is an alternative procedure that is sometimes used to treat neurologically impaired children with GERD. Preliminary studies have shown it may have a lower failure rate and a lower incidence of recurrent reflux.

In 2012 the U.S. Food and Drug Administration (FDA) approved a device called the LINX, which consists of a series of metal beads with magnetic cores that are placed surgically around the lower esophageal sphincter, for those with severe symptoms that do not respond to other treatments. Improvement of GERD symptoms is similar to those of the Nissen fundoplication, although there is no data regarding long-term effects. Compared to Nissen fundoplication procedures, the procedure has shown a reduction in complications such as gas bloat syndrome that commonly occur. Adverse responses include difficulty swallowing, chest pain, vomiting, and nausea. Contraindications that would advise against use of the device are patients who are or may be allergic to titanium, stainless steel, nickel, or ferrous iron materials. A warning advises that the device should not be used by patients who could be exposed to, or undergo, magnetic resonance imaging (MRI) because of serious injury to the patient and damage to the device.

Some patients who are at an increased surgical risk or do not tolerate PPIs may qualify for a more recently developed incisionless procedure known as a TIF transoral incisionless fundoplication. Benefits of this procedure may last for up to six years.

Special populations

Pregnancy 
GERD is a common condition that develops during pregnancy, but usually resolves after delivery. The severity of symptoms tend to increase throughout the pregnancy. In pregnancy, dietary modifications and lifestyle changes may be attempted, but often have little effect. Some lifestyle changes that can be implemented are elevating the head of the bed, eating small portions of food at regularly scheduled intervals, reduce fluid intake with a meal, avoid eating 3 hours before bedtime, and refrain from lying down after eating. Calcium-based antacids are recommended if these changes are not effective, aluminum- and magnesium hydroxide -based antacids are also safe. Antacids that contain sodium bicarbonate or magnesium trisilicate should be avoided in pregnancy. Sucralfate has been studied in pregnancy and proven to be safe  as is ranitidine and PPIs.

Babies 
Babies may see relief with smaller, more frequent feedings, more frequent burping during feedings, holding the baby in an upright position 30 minutes after feeding, keeping the baby's head elevated while laying on the back, removing milk and soy from the mother's diet or feeding the baby milk protein-free formula. They may also be treated with medicines such as ranitidine or proton pump inhibitors. Proton pump inhibitors however have not been found to be effective in this population and there is a lack of evidence for safety. The role of an Occupational Therapist with an infant with GERD includes positioning during and after feeding. One technique used is called “the log roll technique” which is practiced when changing an infant's clothing or diapers. Placing an infant on their back while having their legs lifted is not recommended since it causes the acid to flow back up the esophagus. Instead, the occupational therapist would suggest rolling the child on the side, keeping the shoulders and hips aligned to avoid acid rising up the baby's esophagus. Another technique used is feeding the baby on their side with an upright position instead of lying flat on their back. The final positioning technique used for infants is to keep them on their tummy or upright for 20 minutes after feeding.

Epidemiology 
In Western populations, GERD affects approximately 10% to 20% of the population and 0.4% newly develop the condition. For instance, an estimated 3.4 million to 6.8 million Canadians have GERD. The prevalence rate of GERD in developed nations is also tightly linked with age, with adults aged 60 to 70 being the most commonly affected. In the United States 20% of people have symptoms in a given week and 7% every day. No data supports sex predominance with regard to GERD.

History 
An obsolete treatment is vagotomy ("highly selective vagotomy"), the surgical removal of vagus nerve branches that innervate the stomach lining. This treatment has been largely replaced by medication. Vagotomy by itself tended to worsen contraction of the pyloric sphincter of the stomach, and delayed stomach emptying. Historically, vagotomy was combined with pyloroplasty or gastroenterostomy to counter this problem.

Research 
A number of endoscopic devices have been tested to treat chronic heartburn.
 Endocinch puts stitches in the lower esophogeal sphincter (LES) to create small pleats to help strengthen the muscle. However, long-term results were disappointing, and the device is no longer sold by Bard.
 The Stretta procedure uses electrodes to apply radio-frequency energy to the LES. A 2015 systematic review and meta-analysis in response to the systematic review (no meta-analysis) conducted by SAGES did not support the claims that Stretta was an effective treatment for GERD. A 2012 systematic review found that it improves GERD symptoms.
 NDO Surgical Plicator creates a plication, or fold, of tissue near the gastroesophageal junction, and fixates the plication with a suture-based implant. The company ceased operations in mid-2008, and the device is no longer on the market.
 Transoral incisionless fundoplication, which uses a device called Esophyx, may be effective.

See also 
 Acid perfusion test
 Esophageal motility disorder
 Esophageal motility study

References

Further reading 
 
 
 

Medical conditions related to obesity
Stomach disorders
Wikipedia medicine articles ready to translate
Wikipedia neurology articles ready to translate